Splay is the debut studio album by the rock band Shiner. It was released in 1996 on DeSoto Records.

Track listing
All songs written by Allen Epley, Shawn Sherill, and Tim Dow.
"HeShe" – 3:00
"Brooks" – 2:40
"Complaint" – 2:56
"Bended Knee" – 4:13
"Fetch a Switch" – 6:51
"Slipknot" – 3:15
"Martyr" – 4:06
"Released" – 5:08
"Frown" – 5:34
"Pearle" – 3:52

Personnel
 Allen Epley – vocals, guitar
 Shawn Sherill – bass guitar
 Tim Dow – drums
 Bob Weston – production
 J. Robbins – design, graphics

References

External links
 thirdgearscratch Splay

1996 debut albums
Shiner (band) albums
DeSoto Records albums
Albums produced by Bob Weston